The Singhalese Sports Club Cricket Ground is one of the most famous cricket grounds of Sri Lanka. It is the 
headquarters of Sri Lanka Cricket, the controlling body of cricket in Sri Lanka. The ground staged its first Test in 1984 against New Zealand. The first One Day International was played in 1982 against England.

100 Test centuries have been scored at the ground by players from all 10 of the Test nations. The first of these was made by Roy Dias in 1984. Mahela Jayawardene's 374 is the highest score made at the ground, it is also the fourth highest Test score of all time. Mahela Jayawardene also holds the record for most Test centuries at the ground with 11. The highest score by an overseas player is 221 made by Brian Lara in 2001.

18 One Day International centuries have been scored at the ground. The Pakistan player Younis Khan has made the highest score with 144 against Hong Kong in 2004.

Key
 * denotes that the batsman was not out.
 Inns. denotes the number of the innings in the match.
 Balls denotes the number of balls faced in an innings.
 NR denotes that the number of balls was not recorded.
 Parentheses next to the player's score denotes his century number at the Singhalese Sports Club Cricket Ground.
 The column title Date refers to the date the match started.
 The column title Result refers to whether the player's team won lost or if the match was drawn or a no result.

List of centuries

Test centuries

The following table summarises the Test centuries scored at the Singhalese Sports Club Cricket Ground.

One Day International centuries

The following table summarises the One Day International centuries scored at the Singhalese Sports Club Cricket Ground.

External links
Cricinfo SSC ground profile

References 

Sinhalese
Cricket grounds in Sri Lanka
Centuries
Cricket